Edward Bowen (December 1, 1780 – April 11, 1866) was an Irish-born lawyer, judge and political figure in Lower Canada. He was the first Chief Justice of the Superior Court for provincial Quebec, and the second Chancellor of Bishop's University, in Sherbrooke.

Life
Born in Kinsale in 1780, he was the son of James Bowen (1740–1796), Staff Surgeon in the British Army, who died at Martinique. His mother, Isabella, was the daughter of Richard Sheffield Cassan of Sheffield, County Offaly, and his wife Isabella Hamilton, sister of the Rt. Rev. Hugh Hamilton, Bishop of Ossory. Educated at Drogheda Academy, Bowen came to Lower Canada in 1797, with his great-aunt Anne Hamilton, and her husband, Lt.-Colonel Henry Caldwell. He studied law and entered the offices of Jonathan Sewell. He was called to the bar of Lower Canada in 1803. Bowen served as Lieutenant and then Captain in the Quebec militia.

In 1808, he was chosen as attorney general for Lower Canada by Governor Sir James Henry Craig; he was forced to step down after Norman Fitzgerald Uniacke was chosen by the authorities in London. He was named King's Counsel in 1809, and also served as acting attorney general from 1810 to 1812. In 1809, he was elected to the Legislative Assembly of Lower Canada for William-Henry; he supported the English party. In 1812, he was named judge in the Court of King's Bench at Quebec. He was named to the Legislative Council in 1824. In 1849, he was named chief justice to the newly appointed Superior Court. Bowen also served as French translator for the Executive Council and French secretary for the province.

He died at Quebec City in 1866, and was buried at Mount Hermon Cemetery, section A, in the formerly independent city of Sillery, which was amalgamated into Quebec City, in 2002.  The Rev. G. V. Housman, of the Church of England, was the officiating clergyman. Bowen was the owner of the cemetery's land in 1830.

For many years a portrait of Edward Bowen hung in the Senate chamber in Ottawa.

Family
In 1819, Bowen built a commodious two-story house cut from local stone, of six or seven bays. Two end bays projected forward from the central two bays, suggestive of both French and English architectural influence, but in contrast to the earlier French traditions at Quebec. The house stood on Mount Carmel Street (formerly Cathedral Street) in Quebec City. In 1807, Bowen had married Eliza, the daughter of James Davidson, a surgeon formerly attached to the Royal Canadian Volunteers. They had eight sons and eight daughters:

Alicia Catherine Aubigvey Bowen
Ann Emily Bowen
Charlotte Louise Caldwell Bowen
Eliza Cecilia Bowen, married The Hon. Edward Hale, of Quebec
Isabella Cassan Bowen
Louisa Aylmer Bowen
Lucy Irwin Bowen
Mary Sophia Bowen
Charles Marshall Bowen
Charles William Bowen
Edward Henry Bowen
Francis Nathaniel Burton Bowen
George Frederick Bowen
George Mountain Bowen
James Bowen
Noel Hill Fox Maule Bowen
William Hamilton Bowen

A photograph of Bowen's daughter Isabella Cassan is on exhibit at Piney Grove at Southall's Plantation in Virginia, United States.  A portrait of Bowen's granddaughter, Isabella Forsyth Bell, and photograph of his great-grandson, Frederick Noel Bell Hyndman, are also exhibited.  Piney Grove at Southall's Plantation remains in possession of the family.  The furnishings of Piney Grove at Southall's Plantation includes pieces of furniture and silver that may descend from the Bowen family in Canada.

References

 
 
 

1780 births
1866 deaths
19th-century Irish people
Irish expatriates in Canada
Members of the Legislative Assembly of Lower Canada
Members of the Legislative Council of Lower Canada
Politicians from County Cork
Irish emigrants to pre-Confederation Quebec
Canadian King's Counsel
Lower Canada judges
Province of Canada judges
Attorneys-General of Lower Canada
Immigrants to Lower Canada
People from Kinsale
Burials at Mount Hermon Cemetery